Tanya Hosch is an Australian social activist.

Career 
Hosch held advocacy and consulting roles with the aim of increasing philanthropic investment into  Indigenous development. She was a key contributor in the creation of the National Congress of Australia's First Peoples, and a foundation director of the Australian Indigenous Leadership Centre and the Australian Indigenous Governance Institute.

On 13 February 2013, Tanya addressed the National Press Club. The title of her address, delivered with Jason Glanville, was "Recognition: Why It's Right".

In 2013, Hosch was appointed as the inaugural Independent Chair of Price Waterhouse Coopers Indigenous Consulting, and also served on the boards of  Bangarra Dance Theatre and the Australian Red Cross. In 2014, she was appointed to the Review Panel for the Act of Recognition (2013) to provide a report to the Minister for Aboriginal Affairs in September 2014. In October 2015, Hosch was appointed as a director of the Indigenous Land Corporation for three years.
Hosch was the joint campaign director for the Recognise campaign run by Reconciliation Australia (wound up in 2017), a position shared with Tim Gartrell.

AFL

Hosch was named the general manager of inclusion and social policy at the Australian Football League in 2016, beating former Labor Senator Nova Peris to the role, and becoming the second female executive at the AFL.

Awards and honours

In 2013 Hosch was named in the South Australian Women's Honour Roll. 

In 2012, 2013 and 2015 she was recognised in the list of "100 Women of Influence" Awards run by Westpac and the Australian Financial Review to recognise women who are achievers in Australian business and society.

In 2015, Hosch was named in the Australian Women's Weekly Power List of Australia’s 50 most powerful women. 
She was named the 2021 South Australian of the Year.

Personal life 
She is a Torres Strait Islander woman who lives in Adelaide, South Australia

References

Further reading 

Living people
Year of birth missing (living people)
Australian activists